Don Henderson (1937-1991) was an Australian folk singer and songwriter.

Henderson's songs, which include The Basic Wage Dream, Boonaroo, and Put a Light in Every Country Window, are widely played and sang in the folk music tradition.

He wrote lyrics for the 1976 rock musical Hero presented by the Australian Opera in Sydney.

External links
 Music Australia, at National Library of Australia.
 The Don Henderson Project

1937 births
1991 deaths
Australian folk singers
20th-century Australian male singers